Intersex, in humans and other animals, describes variations in sex characteristics including chromosomes, gonads, sex hormones, or genitals that, according to the UN Office of the High Commissioner for Human Rights, "do not fit typical binary notions of male or female bodies".

Intersex people and themes appear in numerous television episodes. Representations have often lacked realism, and in some cases described as stigmatizing or garbage by intersex advocates, with some examples of "everyday social types" but many cases of medical dilemmas, murderers, and ciphers for discussions about sex and gender.

Intersex representations in drama 

Intersex people have been portrayed in fiction as monsters, murderers and medical dilemmas. Canadian sociologist Morgan Holmes, a former activist with the (now defunct) Intersex Society of North America describes fictional representations of intersex people as monsters or ciphers for discussions about sex and gender. Academic and filmmaker Phoebe Hart suggests that television representations of intersex people fulfil "sensational and unsubtle" stereotypes: the Australian drama All Saints portrayed a woman with androgen insensitivity syndrome as both "superwoman" and "genetic glitch", while Grey's Anatomy failed to adequately inform audiences about intersex in an episode that explored gender identity and medical disclosure. Hart highlights Faking It and Freaks and Geeks for presenting realistic characters, or everyday social types. She suggests that other television representations have been more controversial, and sometimes potentially harmful.

Documentary episodes 

Intersex was discussed on British TV for the first time in 1966, and became a topic of interest for broadcast TV and radio in the United States and other countries from 1989.

Drama episodes 

An intersex murderer plot twist trope has been repeated in the TV programs Nip/Tuck (Quentin Costa), Janet King, and Passions (Vincent Clarkson). Examples of a medical dilemmas trope include the 2010 Childrens Hospital episode Show Me on Montana, the 2012 Emily Owens, M.D. episode "Emily and... the Question of Faith", a 2009 episode of House entitled "The Softer Side", and Masters of Sex episode 3 in season 2, "Fight".

The MTV series Faking It marked the first intersex series regular in a TV show, Lauren Cooper, and also the first intersex character played by an intersex person, Raven.

All Saints

Season 9 of Australian medical drama All Saints included a woman with androgen insensitivity syndrome in an episode entitled "Truth Hurts".

Children's Hospital
In the 2010 Childrens Hospital episode "Show Me on Montana", Drs. Flame and Maestro try to convince an intersex child which gender to choose, with each doctor vying for their own gender.

Emily Owens, M.D.
The 2012 Emily Owens, M.D. episode "Emily and... the Question of Faith" featured an intersex baby.

Faking It
In the first 2014 episode of Faking It, "The Morning Aftermath", one of the main characters, Lauren, is revealed to be intersex.

Freaks and Geeks
In the 2000 Freaks and Geeks episode "The Little Things", Ken has to deal with the discovery that his girlfriend had been born with ambiguous genitalia.

Friends
The One with the Rumor, season 8 episode 9 sees a rumor spread that Rachel is a "hermaphrodite". ISNA described the episode as "degrading".

House
In the 2009 episode of House entitled "The Softer Side", a teenager with genetic mosaicism that is unaware of his (the gender his parents choose for him) condition develops dehydration and is admitted to Princeton Plainsboro Teaching Hospital.

Janet King
The character Peta was revealed as intersex in the final episode of the second series of Janet King.

Masters of Sex
Masters of Sex episode 3 in season 2, "Fight", sees Bill Masters delivers an intersex infant. The circumstances of the infant are used as a plot device for Masters to question the nature of masculinity.

The New Normal
"The Goldie Rush", episode 12, uses a person born intersex as an object of derision during a flashback sequence of failed dates.

Nip/Tuck
Nip/Tuck season 3 featured the character Quentin Costa, revealed to be man with 5-alpha-reductase deficiency. It used an intersex variation and plot device of incest that were previously employed in the book Middlesex by Jeffrey Eugenides.

Offspring 
Offspring season 7 has a character revealed to have Mayer–Rokitansky–Küster–Hauser syndrome.

See also 

 Intersex
 Films about intersex
 Intersex characters in fiction
 Literature about intersex
 List of fictional non-binary characters

References 

 
Intersex-related lists